Steven Goode is an American lawyer, currently the W. James Kronzer Chair and Distinguished Teacher Professor at University of Texas School of Law, previously also the Fulbright & Jaworski Professor, G. Rollie White Teaching Excellence Chair and John Jeffers Research Chair.

References

Year of birth missing (living people)
Living people
University of Texas at Austin faculty
American lawyers